Timberlake may refer to:

People
 Amy Timberlake, American author
 Aminu Timberlake (born 1973), American basketball player
 Bob Timberlake (American football) (born 1943), former All-American college and NFL football player
 Bob Timberlake (artist) (born 1937), North Carolina painter, artist and designer of clothing and furniture
 Charles B. Timberlake (1854–1941), former U.S. Representative from Colorado
 Chris Timberlake (born 1988), professional basketball player for the Purefoods Tender Juicy Giants of the PBA
 Craig Timberlake (1920–2006), American stage actor
 Gary Timberlake (born 1948), former Major League Baseball pitcher
 Henry Timberlake (1730–1765), colonial American officer, journalist, and cartographer
 Henry Timberlake (merchant adventurer) (1570–1625), prosperous London ship captain
 James Timberlake (1846–1891), American lawman
 Jeffrey Timberlake, American politician
 Justin Timberlake (born 1981), American singer-songwriter and actor
 Jessica Biel, also known as Jessica Timberlake (born 1982), American actress
 Philip Hunter Timberlake (1883–1981), American entomologist
 Richard Timberlake (1922–2020), American free banking economist
 Timberlake Wertenbaker (born 1951), British playwright

Places
 Cape Timberlake, Antarctica

United States
 Erlanger, Kentucky, previously known as Timberlake
 Timberlake, New Mexico
 Timberlake, North Carolina
 Timberlake, Ohio
 Timberlake, Virginia
 Timberlake High School, Spirit Lake, Idaho

Other uses
 Timberlake Expedition, a 1760 excursion into the Overhill Cherokee lands west of the Appalachian Mountains
 Timberlake v. State, a 1980 Georgia Supreme Court decision

See also
 Timber Lake (disambiguation)
 Timberland (disambiguation)
 Timber
 Lake